Abraham Ragueneau (1623 – after 1681), was a French painter.

Biography
He was born in London to French parents, but became a portrait painter and worked in the Hague as curator of the painting cabinet of William III of England from 1640 to 1669. He also worked in Leiden, Den Bosch, and Zierikzee.

He died after 1681.

References

 
Abraham Ragueneau on Artnet

1623 births
1681 deaths
French painters
Painters from London
Court painters